Secret Love is the seventh studio album by Lorrie Morgan, released in 1998. She dedicated this album to her late father, George Morgan. The album includes cover versions of pop standards. It peaked at number 36 on the Billboard Country Album chart.

Critical reception

Charlotte Dillon of AllMusic praised Morgan's vocal delivery and the instrumentation. Giving it a B−, Alanna Nash of Entertainment Weekly wrote that "Although Lorrie displays some aptitude for the genre, her reading of the lyrics…is overly melodramatic and she fails to give the material the shading and nuance that could make this brave outing more than a vanity recording. "

Track listing
"Once Upon a Time" (Lee Adams, Charles Strouse) – 4:46
"Here's That Rainy Day" (Johnny Burke, Jimmy Van Heusen) – 4:13
"Good Morning Heartache" (Ervin Drake, Dan Fisher, Irene Higginbotham) – 4:43
"I've Got the World on a String" (Harold Arlen, Ted Koehler) – 2:39
"Secret Love" (Sammy Fain, Paul Francis Webster) – 4:49
"My Foolish Heart" (Victor Young, Ned Washington) – 4:07
"Summer of '42 (The Summer Knows)" (Alan Bergman, Marilyn Bergman, Michel Legrand) – 3:58
"They Can't Take That Away from Me" (George Gershwin, Ira Gershwin) – 3:04
"I Wish You Love" (Albert Beach, Charles Trenet) – 4:40
"Fly Me to the Moon" (Bart Howard) – 3:34
"An Affair to Remember (Our Love Affair)" (Harold Adamson, Leo McCarey, Harry Warren) – 4:39

Personnel
Compiled from liner notes.

Musicians
 Beegie Adair - piano
 Tom Bruner - guitar on "Fly Me to the Moon"
 Jim Ferguson - bass guitar
 Barry Green - trombone on "Here's That Rainy Day", "They Can't Take That Away from Me", and "Secret Love"
 David Hungate - guitar
 Nashville String Machine - strings
 Dennis Solee - tenor saxophone on "Good Morning Heartache" and "Fly Me to the Moon"
 Jim White - drums

Technical
 Tom Bruner - conduction, arrangement
 Ricky Cobble - recording
 John Guess - recording, mixing
 Richard Landis - production
 Bob Ludwig - mastering

Chart performance

References

1998 albums
BNA Records albums
Lorrie Morgan albums
Albums produced by Richard Landis
Covers albums
Traditional pop albums